João Luiz Ribeiro (born 15 July 1959) is a Brazilian gymnast. He competed in seven events at the 1980 Summer Olympics.

References

External links
 

1959 births
Living people
Brazilian male artistic gymnasts
Olympic gymnasts of Brazil
Gymnasts at the 1980 Summer Olympics
Sportspeople from Santa Catarina (state)
Gymnasts at the 1979 Pan American Games
Pan American Games bronze medalists for Brazil
Pan American Games medalists in gymnastics
Medalists at the 1979 Pan American Games